The 2005 Laurence Olivier Awards were held in 2005 in London celebrating excellence in West End theatre by the Society of London Theatre.

Winners and nominees
Details of winners (in bold) and nominees, in each award category, per the Society of London Theatre.

Productions with multiple nominations and awards
The following 15 productions, including three operas, received multiple nominations:

 9: Mary Poppins
 8: The Producers
 5: Festen and The Woman in White
 4: All's Well That Ends Well and The History Boys
 3: Hamlet, His Dark Materials, Peter Grimes, Suddenly, Last Summer and The Goat: Who Is Sylvia
 2: Endgame, Grand Hotel, Lady Macbeth of the Mtsensk District and Sweeney Todd

The following four productions received multiple awards:

 3: The History Boys
 2: His Dark Materials, Mary Poppins and The Producers

See also
 59th Tony Awards

References

External links
 Previous Olivier Winners – 2005

Laurence Olivier Awards ceremonies
Laurence Olivier Awards, 2005
Laurence Olivier Awards
Laur
Laurence Olivier Awards